Daniel Webster Birthplace State Historic Site is a state park and historic house museum in Franklin, New Hampshire. It preserves the two-room log cabin associated with the 1782 birth and early childhood years of Daniel Webster, a noted orator and statesmen. The restored house reflects late 18th-century farm life. The house is open seasonally on weekends.

See also

 Daniel Webster Family Home
 Daniel Webster Law Office
 Thomas–Webster Estate

References

External links
Daniel Webster Birthplace State Historic Site New Hampshire Department of Natural and Cultural Resources

State parks of New Hampshire
Parks in Merrimack County, New Hampshire
Museums in Merrimack County, New Hampshire
Historic house museums in New Hampshire
Houses in Merrimack County, New Hampshire
Franklin, New Hampshire
Protected areas established in 1950
1950 establishments in New Hampshire
Birthplaces of individual people
Birthplace State Historic Site